Brunellia farallonensis is a species of plant in the Brunelliaceae family. It is endemic to Colombia.

References

farallonensis
Endemic flora of Colombia
Conservation dependent plants
Near threatened flora of South America
Taxonomy articles created by Polbot